Grinnell Glacier is in the heart of Glacier National Park in the U.S. state of Montana. The glacier is named for George Bird Grinnell, an early American conservationist and explorer, who was also a strong advocate of ensuring the creation of Glacier National Park. The glacier is in the Lewis Range and rests on the north flank of Mount Gould at an altitude averaging , in the Many Glacier region of the park.

The glacier has been one of the most photographed glaciers in the park and many of these photographs date back to the mid 19th century during the late Little Ice Age. When compared with images taken over subsequent years, the glacier has obviously retreated substantially. In 1850, Grinnell Glacier measured , including the area of The Salamander Glacier, an ice apron or shelf glacier that used to be attached to Grinnell, but is now separate. By 1993, Grinnell Glacier measured  and The Salamander measured .

Between 1966 and 2005, Grinnell Glacier lost almost 40 percent of its acreage.
Glaciologists have predicted that if carbon dioxide levels increase at a worst-case scenario, all the glaciers in the park, including Grinnell, will disappear by the year 2030. However, under a modest increase in overall carbon dioxide levels, some glaciers will remain until the year 2277.

Gem Glacier, one of the smallest remaining glaciers in the park, is located on the Garden Wall above Grinnell. Repeat photography taken between the years 1938 and 2009 (as shown below) show that Grinnell Glacier has retreated significantly over that period.  The Salamander and Gem Glaciers have shown little change in area over the same period of time. The Salamander receives its name for its shape and its coloring, which comes from the serratia bacteria that grows on it.

The glacier can be reached after a  hike from a trailhead beginning at Swiftcurrent Lake.

See also
Retreat of glaciers since 1850
List of glaciers in the United States
Glaciers in Glacier National Park (U.S.)

References

Glaciers of Glacier County, Montana
Glaciers of Glacier National Park (U.S.)
Lewis Range
Glaciers of Montana